Deportes Colina is a Chilean football club, based on Colina, a comune in the Santiago Metropolitan Region. They currently play in the third level of Chilean football, the Segunda Division.

The club was founded on November 27, 2014 as A.C. Colina. Debuted in Tercera Division B in 2016 and won the Tercera División Cup in 2015 and 2016.

Deportes Colina was created with the support of the authorities of Colina and Athletic Club Barnechea.

Titles
Tercera División Cup: 2
2015, 2016

Seasons
1 season in Segunda División
3 seasons in Tercera División
1 seasons in Tercera División B

Players

Current squad
.

See also
Chilean football league system

External links
Club Website 

2014 establishments in Chile
Association football clubs established in 2014
Football clubs in Chile